Open Talk is a weekly topical debate ANS TV television program in Azerbaijan. The show typically features politicians from two political parties as well as other public figures.  Open Talk is presented by Sevinj Osmanqizi.

It is usually recorded about 24 hours prior to transmission, but has been broadcast live.

Origins
Open Talk began on 10 September 2011, as a first face-to-face television debate between political parties. It was originally intended to have only a short run, but the program became very popular and was duly extended. Political leaders labeled as “radical opposition”
and blacklisted for over a decade, appeared in the debate. Since its launch, Sevinj Osmanqizi has been the program's presenter.

References
 Open Talk (18 April 2012) 
 ANS TV introduces a political special, “Open Talk,” a televised debate between political parties."  IREX MSI Index
 Open Talk official web site (29 November 2001)  
 525 Qazet, Open Talk? 

Azerbaijani television shows
Azerbaijani-language television shows
2011 Azerbaijani television series debuts